Paracastalia is a genus of beetles in the family Buprestidae, containing the following species:

 Paracastalia bettoni Waterhouse, 1904
 Paracastalia duvivieri (Kerremans, 1898)
 Paracastalia gebhardti (Hoscheck, 1931)
 Paracastalia inornata (Kerremans, 1906)
 Paracastalia louwi Hohn, 1982
 Paracastalia minima Kerremans, 1905
 Paracastalia plagiata (Kerremans, 1899)
 Paracastalia scholtzi Holm, 1982

References

Buprestidae genera